In the Ulster Cycle of Irish mythology, Finnbhennach ("white-horned" sometimes rendered as "Whitehorn") was an extremely fertile stud bull owned by king Ailill of Connacht.

He was originally one of Bodb Dearg's pig-keepers, who fell out with one of his colleagues. The two fought, taking a series of animal and human forms, before finally becoming two worms who were swallowed by two cows and reborn as two bulls, Finnbhennach and Donn Cuailnge. Finnbhennach was born into the herds of queen Medb, but thought belonging to a woman beneath him and joined her husband's herds instead.

Donn Cuailnge was born into the herds of Dáire mac Fiachna of Cooley. He bulled a heifer belonging to the Mórrígan, and the resulting bull-calf fought Finnbhennach, and narrowly lost. After seeing that Medb was determined to see Finnbhennach fight the bull-calf's sire.

When Medb discovered that owning Finnbhennach made Ailill richer than her, she resolved to even the account by possessing Donn Cuailnge. She launched the Táin Bó Cuailnge (Cattle Raid of Cooley) and eventually brought Donn back to Cruachan. The two bulls fought. Finnbhennach was killed, Donn Cuailnge mortally wounded.

Ulster Cycle
Irish legendary creatures
Characters in Táin Bó Cúailnge
Mythological bulls

de:Donn Cuailnge und Findbennach